The Fraser Valley Regional District (FVRD) is a regional district in British Columbia, Canada. Its headquarters are in the city of Chilliwack. The FVRD covers an area of 13,361.74 km² (5,159 sq mi). It was created in 1995  by an amalgamation of the Fraser-Cheam Regional District and Central Fraser Valley Regional District and the portion of the Dewdney-Alouette Regional District from and including the District of Mission eastwards.

The FVRD is the third most populous Regional District in British Columbia, incorporating roughly the eastern half of the Lower Mainland of southwestern BC, and is bordered by Whatcom County, Washington to the south, Metro Vancouver to the west, the Okanagan-Similkameen Regional District to the east, the Squamish-Lillooet Regional District to the northwest, and the Thompson-Nicola Regional District to the northeast.

It also includes unincorporated areas north of the City of Pitt Meadows, which were part of the Dewdney-Alouette Regional District but which were not transferred to the Metro Vancouver Regional District (MVRD) when it expanded to include Pitt Meadows and Maple Ridge.

Demographics 

Population by census subdivision

Ethnicity 

Note: Totals greater than 100% due to multiple origin responses.

Language 
According to the 2011 Census, 76.47% of Fraser Valley's population have English as mother tongue; Punjabi is the mother tongue of 10.02% of the population, followed by German (3.49%), Dutch (1.39%), French (1.07%), Korean (0.69%), Spanish (0.66%), Tagalog (0.35%), Chinese, n.o.s. (0.33%), and Vietnamese (0.30%).

Services
While the member municipalities provide for their own municipal services, the FVRD acts as the local government for the electoral areas. As a local government or regional district, it can provide services such as water piping, storm sewers, sanitary sewers, street lighting, waste management, fire protection, mosquito control, E911 service, emergency preparedness/recovery, cablevision, air quality monitoring, library funding, growth management, park maintenance, building inspections and bylaw enforcement, planning, and development approvals. Each area does not necessarily receive all these services so each electoral area pays property taxes, through the provincial government, in accordance with the particular services they receive. The FVRD has opted to implement a regional growth strategy, as allowed by Section 25 of the BC Local Government Act.

Political structure
The regional district is a federation of municipalities and electoral areas. Each municipality appoints councillors to the board of directors for the regional district in proportion to their relative population sizes and the electoral areas directly elect one director each.

Economy
Economically, the area has grown around resource extraction, specifically farming, logging and gravel mining. Much of the Fraser Valley's land base is within the Agricultural Land Reserve (ALR). The balance, not privately owned is in Crown Lands. Retirement and recreational services (like campgrounds, RV parks, boating, skiing etc.) have become increasingly important. However, most commercial and industrial activities are kept within the municipal boundaries and leaving the electoral areas for farming and rural residential uses.

Electoral area, geography, and climate
The areas in a regional district that are not incorporated are called ‘electoral areas’.

Electoral area "A"
Boston Bar and North Bend, with populations nearing 200 people each, are the two main small towns in this area. Other residents of this area live in small subdivisions (i.e. Canyon Alpine and Falls Creek) or Indian reserves which line the Fraser Canyon.

Electoral area "B"
Communities in this area are connected by three highways (Highway #1, #3, #5) which radiate out of the District of Hope. The communities of Dogwood Valley, Emory Creek, and Choate are just north of Hope and have a combined population of about 133 people. Sunshine Valley is a community on BC Highway 3 southeast of Hope with 164 people and was originally a Japanese internment camp named Tashme. Other communities in this area include Laidlaw, west of Hope, and Spuzzum, north of Yale.

Electoral area "C"
Communities in this area include Lake Errock with 368 people, Harrison Mills with 141 people, and the resort town of Hemlock Valley, with only 15 permanent residents (but several hundred hotel guests and condo residents during the ski season). There are vacation homes on islands in Harrison Lake.

Electoral area "D"
The population of this area lives in the unincorporated villages of Popkum and Bridal Falls. Combined they have a population of 972 people.

Electoral area "E"
The Chilliwack River runs east-west through this area. Most of the population live in the small area between the mountains and the river, which is generally divided into three areas: Slesse Park, Baker Trails and Bell Acres.

Other residents of this area live on the north end of Cultus Lake, or in the Columbia Valley, south of Cultus Lake, bordering Washington state.

Electoral area "F"
Area F lies between the boundaries of the Squamish-Lillooet Regional District to the north and west, the Metro Vancouver Regional District to the west, Electoral Area G and the cities of Mission and Maple Ridge to the South, and Electoral Area C to the east. The Area F population of approximately 1,300 people lives exclusively in the southern, lowland portion of Area F, specifically that between Hatzic Lake and the southeast end of Stave Lake, as everything in this electoral area north of Stave Lake is inaccessible or uninhabitable. This inhabited lowland area is also known as Hatzic Valley, and includes the unincorporated localities of McConnell Creek and Miracle Valley in the north, and Hatzic Prairie and the farming town of Durieu in the south.

Electoral Area "G"
This small but populous (~1,800 pop.) Electoral Area lies mainly north of the Fraser River but also encompasses portions of Sumas Mountain to the south (formerly Electoral Area "H".) Area "G" borders the District of Mission to the west, Electoral Areas "F" and "C" to the North and East and the city of Abbotsford, British Columbia to the south. It includes the communities of Hatzic Island, Dewdney, Nicomen Island, and Deroche. FVRD local services provided to Area "G" include the Dewdney and Deroche Community Water Systems, North Fraser Fire Protection, North Side Street Lighting and North Side Garbage.

Farming (dairy, nursery and blue berries) and resource extraction (forestry and aggregate) along with recreation are the primary activities. Approximately one-quarter of the residents live on Hatzic Island with much of the Electoral Area's remaining population residing in more rural locations and on Leq’a:mel First Nation Reserve lands.

The Sasquatch Lions Club (member club of Lions Clubs International) is the predominant service organization found in Area "G" and the Deroche and District Community Association has been active since 1908.

Electoral Area "H"
This new Electoral Area H was re-established in 2014 to include Cultus Lake and Columbia Valley. Previously, Electoral Area H was dissolved in 2008, with privately owned lands within the area being annexed into Abbotsford, and crown lands being reassigned to Electoral Area "G". The previous area consisted of the majority of Sumas Mountain.

See also
 Pacific Ranges - the mountains comprising the northern half to the district.
 Fraser Valley - the river valley comprising the southern half of the district.

Notes

References

Sources
Community Profile: Fraser Valley Regional District, British Columbia; Statistics Canada

External links 

 
Regional districts of British Columbia